Jean Goodwin Messinger is an author who has written books covering stories of World War II and Holocaust survivors including the book, Hannah: From Dachau to the Olympics and Beyond  that she wrote in 2005. That particular book brought Messinger notoriety because it was revealed later after the book's publication that the subject of the book, Rosemarie Pence had lied about her story, which then made the biography fictional.

False biography
Messinger did not verify the stories that Pence had told her, but instead took Pence's stories as factual. Later, when it was revealed that Pence had lied, the biography was then branded as fictional. Messinger commented, "I was terribly embarrassed. Not only for me, but for everyone else touched by this." Messinger further stated, "I regarded this woman as a sister for the years I have known her. This revelation is shocking and disappointing to all of us who knew her and loved her, and counted her as a trusted friend."

Works
Same War Different Battlefields: Inspiring Stories from Civilians Impacted By WWII - 2015
Voices From The Other Side: Inspiring German WWII Memoirs - 2014
Pride, Politics, and Style: History of the 1903 El Paso County Courthouse
A Closer Look at Beaver Dam - 1981
Faith in High Places: Historic Country Churches of Colorado (co-author)
Where Thy Glory Dwells: Historic Churches of Colorado Springs (co-author) - 1998
Hannah: From Dachau to the Olympics and Beyond
In the Best of Families
Same War Different Battlefields - 2008
With Love from Grandma Jean
Brody’s List: A Christmas Message for Kids of All Ages - 2012

Reviews
Regarding Voices From The Other Side: Inspiring German WWII Memoirs, World War II Today said: "Jean Goodwin Messinger has done a very valuable service in bringing together a collection of stories from elderly residents of Colorado, USA. All of them eventually found peace and security in America but they all began their lives in very different circumstances, in Hitler’s Germany."

References

American women writers
Living people
Year of birth missing (living people)
Place of birth missing (living people)
21st-century American women